Jennifer Hanson is the self-titled debut studio album by American country music artist Jennifer Hanson. Released in 2003 on Capitol Records Nashville, it produced three singles for Hanson on the Billboard Hot Country Songs charts: "Beautiful Goodbye" at #16, " This Far Gone" at #42, and "Half a Heart Tattoo" at #40. The album itself reached #20 on the Top Country Albums charts.

"It Isn't Just Raining" was originally recorded by Pam Tillis on her 2002 album Thunder and Roses.

Track listing

Credits
Gary Burnette – acoustic guitar, electric guitar, gut string guitar
J. T. Corenflos – electric guitar
Eric Darken – percussion
Dan Dugmore – acoustic guitar, electric guitar, slide guitar, steel guitar, lap steel guitar
Thomas Flora – background vocals
Shannon Forrest – drums, tambourine
Kenny Greenberg – acoustic guitar, electric guitar
Jennifer Hanson – lead vocals, background vocals
Kirk "Jelly Roll" Johnson – harmonica
Troy Lancaster – electric guitar, slide guitar
Nashville String Machine – string section
Mark Nesler – acoustic guitar, background vocals
Michael Rhodes – bass guitar
Mike Rojas – piano, keyboards, clavinet, synthesizer, Hammond organ, Mellotron, Wurlitzer

Chart performance

References
Allmusic (see infobox)

2003 debut albums
Capitol Records albums
Jennifer Hanson albums
Albums produced by Greg Droman